Francesco Giovanni Brugnaro (born 16 March 1943) is an Italian prelate of the Catholic Church who served as Archbishop of Camerino-San Severino Marche from 2007 to 2018.

Biography
Brugnaro was born on 16 March 1943 in Padua. He was ordained a priest of the Archdiocese of Milan on 18 December 1982.

On 24 April 2002, he was named office chief of the Congregation for the Oriental Churches, where he was already working.

On 31 January 2005, Pope John Paul II named him the Permanent Observer of the Holy See to the World Tourism Organization (UNWTO).

Pope Benedict XVI appointed him Archbishop of Camerino-San Severino Marche on 3 September 2007. He was consecrated a bishop on 29 September by Pope Benedict with Cardinals Tarcisio Bertone and Marian Jaworski as co-consecrators.

Pope Francis accepted his resignation on 27 July 2018.

References

External links
Catholic-Hierarchy

Roman Catholic archbishops in Italy
Bishops in le Marche
Diplomats of the Holy See
1943 births
Living people